This is a list of bridges and other crossings of the Potomac River and its North and South branches.  Within each section, crossings are listed from the source moving downstream.

Potomac River
This list contains only crossings of the main channel.  See also Washington Channel#Crossings and Boundary Channel#Crossings.

North Branch Potomac River

Dams

Bridges

South Branch Potomac River

North Fork South Branch Potomac River
Listed heading downstream from source to mouth at the South Branch Potomac River.

South Fork South Branch Potomac River

References

See also

 White's Ferry
 White's Ford
 Potomac Aqueduct Bridge

Lists of coordinates
Potomac River